The discography of Arashi, a Japanese boy band, consists of 17 studio albums, six compilation albums, one extended play, 58 singles, four promotional singles, 25 concert videos and two video albums. Arashi has also released 82 music videos, including "All or Nothing", "Lucky Man", "Mada Minu Sekai e", "P・A・R・A・D・O・X", "Kokoro no Sora", "Don't You Get It", "Mikan", and "5x20".

The group's first release was the eponymous single "Arashi", which was the image song for the 8th World Cup of Volleyball hosted by Japan in 1999. Selling close to a million copies by the end of its chart run, it was the group's highest-selling single until the release of "Kite" in 2020.

Nearly a year and a half after their debut, Arashi released their first studio album Arashi No.1 Ichigou: Arashi wa Arashi o Yobu!. Like "Arashi", it also peaked at number one on the Oricon charts. Until the release of their tenth anniversary compilation album All the Best! 1999–2009, Arashi No.1 Ichigou: Arashi wa Arashi o Yobu! remained the group's best-selling album with overall sales of 323,030 for nearly ten years. They also became the fifth artist in history to dominate the top two placings on the annual Oricon singles chart with "Truth/Kaze no Mukō e" at first and "One Love" in 2008. Such a feat had not been achieved since 1989.

On December 18, 2009, Oricon announced that Arashi topped the annual singles, albums and music DVD rankings for 2009 in Japan. All of the group's 2009 singles ranked within the top five placings on the Oricon singles charts: "Believe/Kumorinochi, Kaisei" at number one, "Ashita no Kioku/Crazy Moon: Kimi wa Muteki" at number two, "My Girl" at number three and "Everything" at number five. Furthermore, the group became the first artist in history to monopolize the top two spots on the singles charts for two consecutive years and to have four releases in the top five. On the Oricon album charts, All the Best! 1999–2009 became the best-selling album of 2009 in Japan by selling over 1.43 million copies, making it the first time Arashi has topped annual album charts.

As of August 2020, Arashi has 54 number-one singles; 47 of which are consecutive since "Pikanchi Double" (February 2004). Arashi also became the first act to have 40 consecutive singles to rank within the Top 3 since their debut. As of 2019, Arashi have sold over 38 million records in Japan.

On February 7, 2020, Arashi released all 16 original albums worldwide in digital form, not including compilation or soundtrack albums. In total, 256 songs available in addition to the singles previously released.

Albums

Studio albums

Compilation albums

Soundtracks

Extended plays

Singles

2000s

2010s

2020s

As featured artist

Promotional singles

Other charted songs

Videography

Concert videos

Music video collections

Music videos

Notes

References

External links
 Official website
 Arashi discography at Johnny's net
 Arashi release summary at Oricon
 

 
 
Discographies of Japanese artists
Pop music group discographies